Robert Guttmann (born 20 April 1880 in Sušice, Southern Bohemia; died 14 March 1942 in the Łódź Ghetto), was a Czech painter.

Life 
Robert Guttmann attended primary school in Planá nad Lužnicí and secondary school in České Budějovice, leaving after two years. In 1895 his family moved to Prague, where he attended the two-year Bergmann private business school and then the private art school of the landscape painter Alois Kirnig. From 1893, Guttmann was involved in a Jewish youth organization, and in 1897 he set off for the first Zionist congress in Basel. He hiked to Basel on foot, financing the trip by selling hand-painted postcard views and caricatures. This was to remain his main source of income in later years. In 1899 he was a co-founder of a Zionist organization in Prague. He attended most of the Zionist congresses until 1925, where his eccentric appearance set him apart from other delegates.

Guttmann was a Prague café and street painter. His striking appearance and extensive travels helped to make him famous in his day. “The Professor”, as he was known, sold his art for pocket change. He was widely photographed and caricatured in Czechoslovakia.

He wandered through Slovakia and Carpathian Ukraine visiting Jewish communities in those areas.

With the German occupation of Czechoslovakia in early 1939, the kindly world Guttmann had been used to living in suddenly vanished. Now allowed only to go to the "Jewish" Café Roxy, he spent most of his time in his small room with his pictures and newspaper clippings. A touching photograph survives of Guttmann striding along a street in Prague's Old Town in 1941, still dressed in his customary bohemian style but wearing a Star of David.

On 16 October 1941 Guttmann was deported on the first transport that left Prague for the Lodz ghetto. Life in the harsh confines of the ghetto seems to have been unendurable for the free-spirited artist who had roamed eastern Europe on foot. He became apathetic and silent, staring vacantly into space, still clutching the folder he used to carry around Prague. He died on 12 March 1942.

Guttmann's painting style does not fit into classical art methods: it can perhaps be viewed as an original form of primitivism. As an artist he defended his right to freedom of self-expression: "I am completely independent and happy that I have escaped the pedantry of the academic world and that I am free to live and rage!". During his lifetime, he was known more as a Prague character than as an artist. It was only after World War 2 that his works came to be admired as the creations of an original naive artist.
Some of his surviving works from 1939 to 1941 appear in the collection of the Jewish Museum in Prague, one of whose branches opened in 2001 as the Robert Guttmann Gallery with an exhibition of his pictures.

References

Further reading 
 
 Guttmann, Robert, in: Ernst Klee: Das Kulturlexikon zum Dritten Reich. Wer war was vor und nach 1945. Frankfurt am Main : S. Fischer, 2007, ISBN 978-3-10-039326-5, S. 207
 Guttmann, Robert, in: Encyclopaedia Judaica, 1971, Band 7, Sp. 995
 Arthur Heller: Guttmann. Eine psychologische Studie über den Maler Robert Guttmann. Prague: "Litevna“ – Literarischer und wissenschaftlicher Verlag Vojtech Tilkovsky, 1932

External links 
 Robert Guttmann: painter, globetrotting Zionist, and “most caricatured man” of 20th century Prague
 Robert Guttmann - Painter and Traveller of Prague
 Robert Guttmann – The Prague Wanderer
 Robert Guttmann Databse of Victims of the Nazi Persecution
 Robert Guttmann (German Wikipedia article)

Czech male painters

1880 births

1942 deaths

People who died in the Łódź Ghetto